Year 121 (CXXI) was a common year starting on Tuesday (link will display the full calendar) of the Julian calendar. At the time, it was known as the Year of the Consulship of Verus and Augur (or, less frequently, year 874 Ab urbe condita). The denomination 121 for this year has been used since the early medieval period, when the Anno Domini calendar era became the prevalent method in Europe for naming years.

Events 
 By place 
 Roman Empire 
 Roman settlement in present-day Wiesbaden, Germany is first mentioned. 
 Emperor Hadrian fixes the border between Roman Britain and Caledonia, on a line running from the River Tyne to the Solway Firth. 
 Construction of the Temple of Venus and Roma begins in Rome.

 Asia 
 Era name changes from Yongning (2nd year) to Jianguang in the Chinese Eastern Han Dynasty.

Births 
 April 26 – Marcus Annius Verus, later Emperor Marcus Aurelius (d. 180)

Deaths 
 Cai Lun, Chinese inventor of paper and the papermaking process (b. AD 50)
 Deng Sui, Chinese empress of the Han Dynasty (b. AD 81)
 Eleutherius and Antia, Roman Christian martyrs and saints

References